Second wine or second label   (French: Second vin) is a term commonly associated with Bordeaux wine to refer to a second label wine made from cuvee not selected for use in the Grand vin or first label. In some cases a third wine or even fourth wine is also produced. Depending on the house winemaking style, individual plots of a vineyard may be selected, often those of the youngest vines, and fermented separately, with the best performing barrels being chosen for the house's top wine and the other barrels being bottled under a separate label and sold for a lower price than the Grand vin.

In less favorable vintages, an estate may choose to release only a second label wine rather than to release a smaller than normal quantity of its Grand vin or a wine that would not be consistent with past vintages under that name. The practice has its roots in the 18th century but became more commercially prominent in the 1980s when consumers discovered these wines as a more affordable way to drink the product of a First growth or classified Bordeaux estate without paying the premium for the estate's label and classification. The opposite phenomenon, of only releasing a top wine in exceptional years (rather than in most years) is seen in Iberia (Spain and Portugal) in "Gran Reserva" reserve wine and vintage port.

From the producer's point of view, a second wine allows the winery to use a stricter selection for its Grand Vin, while still capitalising on its name and distribution channels in selling the second wine, which will be much more profitable than selling off lesser wine "anonymously" to be used in e.g. negociant bulk bottlings.

History
The practice of establishing a second wine began in the 18th century as way for Bordeaux winemakers to be more selective of the wine going into their estate label wine without wasting the remaining wine. According to records, Château Pichon Longueville Comtesse de Lalande shipped its "second wine" of the 1874 vintage to the 1891 Exposition française in Moscow, although La Réserve de la Comtesse would not be for sale to the public until 1973. Château Brane-Cantenac may have had a second label some time in the 18th century according to Decanter, but more evidently, Château Léoville-Las Cases first produced its Clos du Marquis in 1904, and Château Margaux followed with Pavillon Rouge produced from 1908.

Château Mouton Rothschild released the poor 1927 vintage, then named Carruades de Mouton, followed in 1930 by Mouton Cadet as a second label, selling wine from previous difficult harvests considered unfit as château Grand vin vintage at reduced prices, eventually to successful response. The estate has since expanded with more labels pushing Mouton Cadet further down its portfolio, with Le Petit Mouton de Mouton Rothschild currently the estate's second wine and Mouton Cadet evolving into its own brand with a distinctly different marketing strategy.

In the drive to higher quality that has taken place in recent decades, additional Bordeaux châteaux have added second wine. With the increased market competition since the 1980s, estates became more selective in the assemblage stage, making greater parts of the production disposed to be either sold off in bulk, or blended into second (or third) wine.

Having a second wine is generally a part of the recipe prescribed by Michel Rolland and similar wine-making consultants. As an example, Château Kirwan, a Third Growth in Margaux, added their second wine Les Charmes de Kirwan in 1993, after Rolland was brought in.

Production
In many ways the production of a second wine mirrors the production of estate's Grand vin being made from the same vineyard, with the same blend of grapes and by the same winemaker. Some selection takes place already after harvest, when plots that are often underperforming or are planted with younger vines will be earmarked for the second wine, which means that they receive a "cheaper" treatment with a lower percentage of new barrels. Additional selection will be done after the barrel aging when the winemaker will isolate the best performing barrels that most reflects the house style of the estate label with the remaining wine being bottled under second or even third and fourth labels.

The second wine may have some hints and characteristics of the estate wine but is typically less polished and structured than the estate wine. An estate will rarely promote its second wines and most wine labels will not even mention the parent estate because of the desire to keep the estate solely associated with its Grand vin. However, some high end producers market their second wine as a "wine for earlier consumption" (i.e., quicker to mature) rather than "a lesser wine".

Naming and classification practices
Second wines often do not have the word "château" in their name, but they frequently sport some other part of their winery's name to add name recognition. The second wines of classified growths, since they are different wines, are not themselves part of the 1855 classification or other classifications. They are, however, entitled to use the same appellation as the Grand Vin, as they originate from the same terroir. As an example, Les Forts de Latour is an AOC Pauillac just like Château Latour, but is not a First Growth or any other kind of classified growth.

List of Bordeaux second and third wines

Médoc 1855 classed growths

Sauternes 1855 classed growths

Other Bordeaux

List of non-Bordeaux second and third wines

California

Italy

Spain

See also
 Reserve wine (Gran Reserva)
 Vintage port

References

Great Growths of 1855 official site, Second wines dossier PDF  grand-cru-classe.com

Bordeaux wine
Wine terminology